Mid Morning Matters is a British digital radio show parody written by Steve Coogan, Neil Gibbons, Rob Gibbons and Armando Iannucci, produced by Baby Cow Productions and funded by the British arm of Australian lager company Foster's, starring Coogan as fictional radio DJ Alan Partridge. The first of twelve 15-minute episodes was uploaded to the Foster's Funny website on 5 November 2010, and then available on YouTube. Six 30-minute episodes titled Alan Partridge Mid Morning Matters: Special Edition, edited from the web series, began airing on Sky Atlantic in July 2012 as part of a deal between producers Baby Cow and BSkyB. A second series consisting of six episodes premiered in February 2016.

Plot
The show is shot from the perspective of a webcam in the studio of fictional station North Norfolk Digital. In Mid Morning Matters Alan Partridge (Steve Coogan) is back working as a disc jockey, after the failure of his television career. He is usually joined by 'Sidekick Simon' (Tim Key) who eventually leaves or is fired due to Alan's gradual dislike towards him. Alan is noticeably annoyed when he discovers that Simon has started guesting as a sidekick on another radio show (Bedtime with Branning). After Simon's departure, Alan recruits a new sidekick, Zoe (Pippa Duffy), and quickly develops a crush on her. In the final part of series one, Zoe reveals she is going travelling for three months, much to Alan's disappointment. The episode ends with a shot through the window into the recording booth as Zoe gives him a kiss on the cheek; there is no sound and it is unknown whether Alan has said anything to warrant this reaction or if it is a goodbye kiss. This is a rare low-key ending to an Alan Partridge series with the high point coming in Episode 10 when Alan rebukes Sidekick Simon for his role in a practical joke on him.

Production and TV airing
In August 2010, it was reported that Alan Partridge would make a comeback series online for lager company Foster's. On 8 October 2010, it was announced that the new show, entitled Alan Partridge's Mid Morning Matters, would premiere on 5 November 2010 on Foster's comedy site, fostersfunny.co.uk. In a press release, Steve Coogan announced, in character:

"I am delighted to announce that after years as a regional broadcaster on North Norfolk Digital my groundbreaking radio segment, Mid Morning Matters, will now be accessible to a potential audience of billions via the World Wide Web (www).

That it has taken Foster's to help realise my dream of joining the information superhighway is a damning indictment of the established broadcasters whose shabby treatment of me on Sept 10th 2001 was frankly shabby. I made dozens of calls the next day, all of which were ignored.

My appreciation must go to Armando Iannucci and Baby Cow for ignoring the lies, God bless them. In the meantime I look forward to 'hanging out 'n' chillin' with the MySpace generation."

The first six episodes aired online in December 2010, with the remainder released weekly from 4 February 2011 until episode 12 on 11 March 2011. Following the series, Alan appeared again as part of the Red Nose Day 2011 set for a one-off show akin to the Mid Morning Matters arrangement, and here Side-kick Simon reappears in his former capacity.

Following a deal between Baby Cow Productions and BSkyB in November 2011, the first series was broadcast as six 30-minute episodes on Sky Atlantic, despite the public antipathy of Steve Coogan towards media mogul Rupert Murdoch and his former company 21st Century Fox, who at the time owned a controlling 33% of BSkyB, following the News International phone-hacking scandal. Series two of Mid Morning Matters began airing on Sky Atlantic on 16 February 2016. As with the first series on Sky, series two ran for six 30-minute episodes.

Reception 

The Telegraph called the show "endlessly creative".

Episodes

Series 1

Series 2

Home media
The first series of Mid Morning Matters was released on DVD first, in Australia on 1 March 2012 by 2entertain. It was released on 12 November 2012 in the UK, also by 2entertain. The second series was released on DVD in April 2016.

References

External links

2010 British television series debuts
2016 British television series endings
2010s British sitcoms
British mockumentary television series
British parody television series
English-language television shows
Sky Atlantic original programming
Television shows set in Norfolk